Hourly, Daily is an album by the Australian rock band, You Am I, released in July 1996. The album is Tim Rogers' portrait of Australian life, spread across 15 tracks. Themes include childhood, suburbia and relationships. The album also seems to run the course of a day, "Good Mornin'" beginning with an alarm clock, ending with the question of "Who Takes Who Home" on a night out, and after a period of silence, the hidden track entitled "Forget It Sister" begins with 'good morning baby..'

The album debuted at No. 1 on the Australian ARIA Albums Chart. In October 2010, Hourly, Daily, was listed in the book, 100 Best Australian Albums with their previous album, Hi Fi Way (1995) at No. 8. In December of 2021, the album was listed at no. 11 in Rolling Stone Australia’s ‘200 Greatest Albums of All Time’ countdown.

Reception 
Reviewed in Rolling Stone Australia at the time of release, it was noted that You Am I were moving away from their earlier "screeching guitar" rock towards gentler and more melodic music. The additional accompaniment of trumpets, French horns and string sections was remarked upon. Tim Rogers' writing was said to be, "almost totally concerned with other people, crafting intricate character sketches in The Beatles/Ray Davies tradition."

Juice magazine complimented the musical "width" and "strongly hued richness" on the album, though wondering if old fans would respond to the less direct music. Lyrically, Rogers was said to have, "a thematic cohesion and eye for detail that brings to mind Neil Young or Paul Westerberg at their finest."

In a retrospective piece titled "You Am I Is the Longest Love Affair I Have Ever Had", FasterLouder writer A.H. Cayley singled out Hi Fi Way and Hourly, Daily as the two high points of the band's career, which You Am I fans speak of with a "hushed reverence".

Tim Rogers later said of the album, "I was probably listening to too many Kinks records, it must be said. I'm glad people like it, I don't listen to it."

2013 reissues, concert tour 
In 2013, You Am I reissued remastered versions of Sound As Ever, Hi Fi Way, and Hourly Daily with bonus discs featuring B-sides, out-takes and live recordings. In the winter of 2013, the band toured major cities of Australia on the Hi Fi Daily Double Tour, performing both Hourly Daily and Hi Fi Way in their entirety, followed by an encore of other songs from these reissued collections. Vinyl versions of the three albums were released for the first time to coincide with this tour. In turn, a live recording from the 2013 tour was released as a vinyl/DVD box set titled Live Electrified in 2014.

Track listing
All songs written by Tim Rogers.

Australian version
 "Hourly, Daily"
 "Good Mornin'"
 "Mr. Milk"
 "Soldiers"
 "Tuesday"
 "If We Can't Get It Together"
 "Flag Fall $1.80"
 "Wally Raffles"
 "Heavy Comfort"
 "Dead Letter Chorus"
 "Baby Clothes"
 "Someone Else's Home"
 "Please Don't Ask Me to Smile"
 "Moon Shines on Trubble"
 "Who Takes Who Home?"
 "Forget It Sister" (hidden track)

International version
 "Hourly, Daily"
 "Good Mornin'"
 "Mr. Milk"
 "Soldiers
 "Trike"
 "Tuesday"
 "Opportunities"
 "If We Can't Get It Together"
 "Flag Fall $1.80"
 "Wally Raffles"
 "Heavy Comfort"
 "Dead Letter Chorus"
 "Baby Clothes"
 "Please Don't Ask Me to Smile"
 "Who Takes Who Home?"
 "Forget It Sister" (hidden track)

The international release (June 1997) replaced the songs "Someone Else's Home" and "Moon Shines on Trubble" with "Opportunities" and "Trike", supposedly to increase its overseas appeal by including songs that did not explicitly refer to Sydney or Australia. The international version also replaced the sleeve photo of the ubiquitous Australian overhead telegraph pole with a simpler photo of the band playing live. Unlike the original issue, the new cover also had the virtue of fitting in with You Am I's recurring theme of retro-styled album covers.

Beat Party! (Live at Wiseold's) 
Some copies of the album came with a live bonus disc of songs recorded in May 1996 with Greg Hitchcock on second guitar and organ.
 "Minor Byrd"
 "Punkerella"
 "She's So Fine" (The Easybeats cover)
 "Making Time (Lyrice Ad Nauseum [sic] Mix)" (Creation cover)
 "How Much Is Enough"
 "Applecross Wing Commander"
 "Search And Destroy" (The Stooges cover)

Charts

Certifications

References

External links
 Hourly Daily
 Hourly Daily international release
 October 1996 feature article about You Am I from Rolling Stone Australia issue #527.

1996 albums
ARIA Award-winning albums
You Am I albums